Asela Aluthge (born 22 June 1987) is a Sri Lankan cricketer. He made his first-class debut for Sinhalese Sports Club in the 2009–10 Premier Trophy on 4 December 2009.

References

External links
 

1987 births
Living people
Sri Lankan cricketers
Bloomfield Cricket and Athletic Club cricketers
Sri Lanka Police Sports Club cricketers
Sinhalese Sports Club cricketers
Vauniya District cricketers
Cricketers from Colombo